Juan Alberto Castro (12 June 1934 – 12 July 1979) was an Argentine footballer. He played in two matches for the Argentina national football team in 1957. He was also part of Argentina's squad for the 1957 South American Championship.

References

External links
 

1934 births
1979 deaths
Argentine footballers
Argentina international footballers
Sportspeople from Córdoba, Argentina
Association football forwards
Rosario Central footballers
Club Atlético Huracán footballers
Club Atlético Atlanta footballers
Newell's Old Boys footballers
Club Atlético Colón footballers